Boronia Heights College was a public secondary school in Boronia, a suburb of Melbourne, Victoria, Australia.

It has formerly had the names of Boronia Technical School and Boronia Heights Secondary College.

In 2014, Boronia Heights College merged with Boronia Primary School to form Boronia K-12 College.

In early 2015, the old site of "Boronia Heights College" was shut down and was undergoing demolition as of August 2015.

See also
 List of schools in Victoria
 Victorian Certificate of Education

External links
Boronia Heights College
Department of Education and Early Childhood Development - School Profile

Defunct schools in Victoria (Australia)
Educational institutions established in 1972
Educational institutions disestablished in 2015
1975 establishments in Australia
2015 disestablishments in Australia